Amritpal Singh Dhillon (born 10 January 1993), known professionally as AP Dhillon, is a Punjabi Canadian singer, rapper and record producer associated with Punjabi music. Five of his singles have peaked on the Official Charts Company UK Asian and Punjabi charts, while "Majhail" and "Brown Munde" have topped the chart. Dhillon, alongside his label-mates Gurinder Gill, Shinda Kahlon and Gminxr works as trio under their label 'Run-Up Records'.

Early life 
Amritpal Singh Dhillon was born on 10 January 1993 in Gurdaspur, Punjab, India. He studied from the Little Flower Convent School and completed his graduation in civil engineering from Baba Kuma Singh Ji Engineering College, Hoshiar Nagar affiliated under Punjab Technical University in Kapurthala. Dhillon pursued a diploma in business administration and management from Camosun College in British Columbia. He has since been based in Victoria while working for Run-Up Records.

Career 
Dhillon started his career in 2019 with singles "Fake" and "Faraar". In 2020, his single "Deadly", produced by Gminxr entered UK Asian chart published by the Official Charts Company, and peaked at number 11. Also, the song entered top 5 on UK Punjabi chart. His next single "Droptop" with Gurinder Gill also appeared on both UK Asian and UK Punjabi chart. In June 2020, he collaborated with Gurinder Gill and Manni Sandhu for single "Majhail", which topped both the UK Asian and Punjabi chart, and became their best performance till date. In July 2020, he appeared in "Excuses" by Intense, which peaked at number 3 on UK Asian and topped the UK Punjabi chart. In September 2020, he released "Brown munde" with Gurinder Gill, Gminxr, and Shinda Kahlon. Nav, Sidhu Moose Wala, Money Musik, Anmol Dalwani and Steel Banglez appeared in its music video. The song entered Apple Music chart in Canada. The song debuted at number one on the UK Asian chart, became his second number one on the chart.

In 2020, AP Dhillon released his first EP, Not by Chance. All seven of the songs from the EP charted on the NZ charts and occupied the top five of the Official Punjabi Music chart in the UK.

In 2021, AP Dhillon and his team performed a live concert for the first time as part of the "Over The Top – The Takeover Tour" in major 6 cities in India. Dhillon partners with Boat for brand association.

In 2022, Dhillon collaborated with Amazon Prime Video for the promotion of The Boys (season 3) under which he cues an exclusive version of his track ‘Insane’ in the trailer.

Discography

Extended plays

Singles discography

Production discography

References

External links 
 
 
 

1993 births

Living people

21st-century Canadian male singers
21st-century Canadian rappers

Punjabi-language singers
Punjabi rappers
Desi musicians

Punjabi people
Canadian people of Indian descent
Canadian people of Punjabi descent
Canadian hip hop singers
Canadian musicians of Indian descent
Canadian male singer-songwriters
Canadian male rappers
Canadian record producers

Indian male singers
Indian male pop singers
Indian male singer-songwriters
Indian hip hop singers

Camosun College alumni
People from Gurdaspur
People from Gurdaspur district
People from Punjab, India